Jayaraman Anbazhagan (10 June 1958 – 10 June 2020) was an Indian politician and a 3 times MLA (2001, 2011 & 2016), a Member of the Tamil Nadu Legislative Assembly from the Chepauk-Thiruvallikeni constituency in Chennai District from 2011 to 2020.

As a representative of the Dravida Munnetra Kazhagam party, he was previously elected to the Theagaraya Nagar Constituency in 2001 elections, and was also defeated in the year 2006 election.

Biography
He was elected in the elections of 2011 and was re-elected from the same Chepauk-Thiruvallikeni constituency in Chennai District in the elections of 2016.

A diehard party loyalist, Anbazhagan was also bold and was often referred to as the second Veerapandy S. Arumugam (a senior leader and former DMK minister from Salem who died a few years ago) within the DMK. A three time MLA - though he was a strong man, he could not become a Minister as he returned to the Assembly all the times when his party DMK was sitting in opposition.

Anbazhagan died from COVID-19 on his 62nd birthday on 10 June 2020, in Rela Institute & Medical Centre in Chromepet, Chennai during the COVID-19 pandemic in India, making him the first legislator in India to have died from the virus.

Filmography 
As producer
Aadhi Baghavan (2013)

As distributor
Yaaruda Mahesh (2013)

References 

1958 births
2020 deaths
People from Chennai district
Tamil Nadu MLAs 2011–2016
Tamil film producers
Dravida Munnetra Kazhagam politicians
Tamil Nadu MLAs 2016–2021
Tamil Nadu MLAs 2001–2006
Deaths from the COVID-19 pandemic in India
Tamil Nadu politicians